Han Xu (May 26, 1924 – July 19, 1994) was a Chinese diplomat who served as the Chinese Ambassador to the United States from 1985 to 1989, and as Vice Foreign Minister of China from 1982 to 1985.

Early life 
Han was born May 26, 1924, in Jiangning County, Jiangsu Province. His original name was Shen Chongjian, and Hanxu was his courtesy name, which he later adopted as his full name.

His father, Shen Jiayi, served as a grand justice during the rule of the Chinese Nationalist Government. Because of his father's position in the government, Han received an elite education. In the 1940s, he studied at Yenching University in Beijing where he met Communist leaders including the future Premier Zhou Enlai. Following his graduation from Yenching, Han worked as an English professor at the North China Allied University for several years where he met his wife, Ge Jiyun.

During the Second Sino-Japanese War, Han joined the Chinese Communist army as a guerrilla fighter. His unit helped to rescue American pilots who were shot down by the Japanese over the mountainous areas of northern China. He kept bank notes signed by the pilots he helped save as souvenirs. Han's elder brother, Shen Chonghui, had joined the Republic of China Air Force as a pilot and died in 1937 while bombing the Japanese cruiser Izumo during the Battle of Shanghai.

After the surrender of Japan in 1945, Han served as an interpreter for the peace talks between the Communists and the Nationalists, which were brokered by the United States.

Career 
In the wake of the Communist victory over the Nationalists in the Chinese Civil War, Han joined the Ministry of Foreign Affairs where he took the position of Director of the Protocol Department, a position he would occupy from 1949 until 1963. From 1963 until 1965, Han served as the first secretary of the Chinese Embassy in Moscow. As Director of Protocol, Han assisted in US President Richard Nixon's historic 1972 visit to China. According to the US Secretary of State Henry Kissinger, Han was the first person to greet him when he visited China in 1971.

In 1973, Han was promoted to the first deputy chief of the Chinese Liaison Office in Washington. In the six years Han served the post, he became popular among many in Washington for his sociable attitude and fluency in English.

Following his role as deputy chief of the Liaison Office, Han became Vice-Minister of Foreign Affairs in 1982. As Vice-Minister, Han worked with United States on resolving the Taiwan issue. Over a series of trips and negotiations between then Vice President George Bush, the two parties came to sign the Third Communiqué that would work to decrease the sale of arms to Taiwan by the United States.

In 1985, Han returned to Washington to become the third Chinese ambassador to the United States. In the aftermath Tiananmen Square protests of 1989, the Chinese government and the Chinese Embassy in the United States found themselves flooded with demands for a response. On June 24, 1989, nearly three weeks after the conclusion of the events in Beijing, Han penned an article in The New York Times. It overwhelmingly supported the government action, while also acknowledging the "unfortunate loss of life" that had occurred: "There was, I regret to say, loss of life on both sides. I wonder whether any other government confronting such an unprecedented challenge would have handled the situation any better than mine did."

Later life 
After leaving his position as ambassador in 1989, Han was made chairman of the Chinese People's Association for Friendship with Foreign Countries. As chair, he continued to meet with current and former U.S. officials such as former president Richard Nixon.

On July 19, 1994, Han died of cancer in his Beijing home. When Henry Kissinger learned of his death, he remarked that Han "did many extraordinary things to further Chinese-American relations."

References

External links 
 Ambassador Han Xu's full remarks on the Tiananmen Square Protests

1924 births
1994 deaths
Diplomats of the People's Republic of China
Ambassadors of China to the United States
Politicians from Nanjing
Yenching University alumni
Chinese military personnel of World War II
Chinese expatriates in the Soviet Union